San Roque is a town and municipality in the Colombian department of Antioquia. It is part of the subregion of Northeastern Antioquia. The municipality was founded by Francisco Martinez de Ospina on the 8 February 1880. The town is located between the Nare River and the Nus River. The town was created due to the presence of gold in the areas around the town. The town is located 121 km north of Medellín. The people of this town celebrate most of the traditional festivals that are celebrated in Colombia.

History 
San Roque became a municipality in the year 1884. In 1911 the Antioquia Railway is built, traveling near the town and bringing some economy to the area. San Roque was known as a mining center at this time. The past history is what attracts the modern day tourists, and San Roque is often called "The Land of Cordiality" because the natives are so friendly.

Climate
San Roque has a tropical rainforest climate (Af). It has very heavy rainfall year round.

References 

Municipalities of Antioquia Department